Little Manor, also known as Mosby Hall, is a historic plantation house located in Warren County, North Carolina near the town of Littleton. It was built about 1804, and is a Federal style frame dwelling consisting of a two-story, five bay, pedimented main block flanked by one-story wings. It has a pedimented center bay front porch with Doric order pilasters and an older two-story rear wing, dated to about 1780.

It was listed on the National Register of Historic Places in 1973.

See also
Dr. Charles and Susan Skinner House and Outbuildings, AKA Linden Hall, another plantation house near the town of Littleton

References

Plantation houses in North Carolina
Houses on the National Register of Historic Places in North Carolina
Federal architecture in North Carolina
Houses completed in 1804
Houses in Warren County, North Carolina
National Register of Historic Places in Warren County, North Carolina
1804 establishments in North Carolina

External links
 Little Manor, Littleton, North Carolina at NC State University Libraries